A sculpture trail - also known as "a culture walk" or "art trail" - is a walkway through open-air galleries of outdoor sculptures along a defined route with sequenced viewings encountered from planned preview and principal sight lines.

Settings
Often the distinct walkway is one choice among other less structured ways of exploring intimate sculpture gardens, larger sculpture parks and expansive environmental art sites. They are often disabled and wheelchair accessible routes offering viewing and experiencing the art for many.

Sculptural works of land art and larger site-specific outdoor installation art, especially in fragile natural habitats, use sculpture trails for low-impact accessibility. Some culture walks have sculptor-in-residence programs for creating new temporary or permanent works.

Sculpture trail settings can range from urban parks and private estates, through art museum gardens, to large regional open space and art park sites, with walkways giving access to the sculptures.

Examples

Sculpture by the Sea is a free annual  outdoor sculpture walk that goes from Bronte Beach to Bondi Beach via Tamarama Beach.

See also
Independent public art
Land art
Public art
Spirit of place
Cultural tourism

References

External links
 
International art_nut: Directory of Sculpture Parks
Sculpture trail in the Daintree, Australia

Trail
Footpaths
Garden features
Types of art museums and galleries